Contos is a collection of short stories by the Portuguese writer Eça de Queiroz. It was first published in 1902, two years after his death.

Story titles 
  (The Idiosyncracies of a Young Blonde Woman). Published in English in The Mandarin and other stories
  (A Lyric Poet). Published in English in Alves & Co. and other stories
  (The Mill). Published in English in Alves & Co. and other stories 
  (Civilization)
  (The Treasure). Published in English in Alves & Co. and other stories
  (Friar Genebro). Published in English in Alves & Co. and other stories
  (Adam and Eve in Paradise)
  (The Nurse). Published in English in Alves & Co. and other stories
  (The Hanged Man: literally, The Defunct One). Published in English as The Mandarin and other stories 
 . Published in English in The Mandarin and other stories 
  (The Perfection)
  (The Sweet Miracle). Published in English in Alves & Co. and other stories

Singularidades de uma rapariga Loura (Peculiarities of a Fair-haired Gir) was adapted to cinema by Portuguese filmmaker Manoel de Oliveira in 2009. See Eccentricities of a Blonde-haired Girl.

References

External links
 

Portuguese books
1902 short story collections